Victor Mansaray (born February 2, 1997) is an American professional soccer player who plays as a forward for Vietnamese club Hồ Chí Minh City.

Early life 
Victor Mansaray was born in Freetown, Sierra Leone on February 2, 1997. During his youth, he spent time with his family in both Sierra Leone and Jamaica. He later moved to the Seattle area in Washington, United States. He first lived in the city of Puyallup before moving again to nearby Fife, where he attended Fife High School.

Career

Youth 
Mansaray entered the Seattle Sounders FC Academy midway through the 2012–2013 season and appeared in 20 games, scoring 11 goals. The following season, still with the U-16's, he scored a team-high 18 goals in 24 games.

Club 
In November 2014, Mansaray signed with Seattle Sounders FC, making him the club's youngest ever signing at the age of 17, as well as their fourth Homegrown Player. He first appeared for Sounders FC during a pre-season match in the Desert Diamond Cup on February 21. He was substituted in at the 66th minute and scored a goal at the 74th, but the Sounders ultimately lost to Sporting Kansas City, 2–3. On March 21, 2015, he made his regular season professional debut with USL affiliate club Seattle Sounders FC 2 in a 4–2 victory over Sacramento Republic FC. He made his MLS debut a week later in a 0–0 draw away to FC Dallas.

On February 6, 2017, USL club FC Cincinnati announced that they had acquired Mansaray via a loan from Seattle Sounders. Cincinnati coach Alan Koch played Mansaray primarily as a substitute; Mansaray started for just three of his eight league appearances, and never played a full 90 minutes. On June 27, 2017, it was announced that Mansaray's loan had ended and he had returned to Seattle Sounders.  He was waived by the club on August 10.

After spending a season with Swedish side Umeå FC, Mansaray signed with USL side Charleston Battery for the 2018 season on February 14, 2018. Mansary's option was declined by Charleston on November 30, 2018.

On February 16, 2019, Mansaray joined V.League 1 side Becamex Binh Duong on a short-term contract.

On July 2, 2019, he moved to another V.League 1 club Ho Chi Minh City FC with number 80 jersey. 

In 2020, he joined Hong Linh Ha Tinh, also of V.League 1.

In November 2020, Mansaray agreed a move to former club Becamex Bình Dương for the 2021 season.

International 
Mansaray was selected to the U.S. under-18 national team in August 2014. He played two games in the friendly tournament hosted by the Czech Republic, against Hungary and Ukraine. Before choosing to play for the United States, Mansaray opted to forgo opportunities with Sierra Leone, as well as Jamaica. In December 2014, Mansaray received his third and fourth caps in two games against the Germany under-18 national team.

After turning 18 in February 2015, Mansaray moved up to the U.S. under-20 national team. He made one appearance for the U.S. U-20 team in 2015, followed by six appearances (with two goals scored) in 2016. In early 2017, Mansaray was called up for a U.S. U-20 training camp from January 31 to February 10. However, at the conclusion of the camp, Mansaray was not included on the team's 20-man roster for U-20 World Cup qualifying matches.

Shortly after being dropped from the U.S. team for the 2017 U20 World Cup, Mansaray told press he would be open to being called up by the Sierra Leone national team. On June 5, 2017, Mansaray announced via Instagram that he had been called up by Sierra Leone.

References

External links 

 
 
 

1997 births
Living people
People from Pierce County, Washington
American soccer players
Sierra Leonean footballers
Soccer players from Washington (state)
Association football forwards
Major League Soccer players
Homegrown Players (MLS)
USL Championship players
Ettan Fotboll players
V.League 1 players
FC Cincinnati (2016–18) players
Seattle Sounders FC players
Umeå FC players
Charleston Battery players
Becamex Binh Duong FC players
Ho Chi Minh City FC players
Expatriate footballers in Sweden
Expatriate footballers in Vietnam
Sierra Leonean emigrants to the United States
United States men's under-20 international soccer players
United States men's youth international soccer players